Sa'ad Mohammad Abdulaziz Al-Houti (born 24 May 1954) is a Kuwaiti football midfielder who played for Kuwait in the 1982 FIFA World Cup. He also played for Kuwait SC.

References

External links
FIFA profile

1954 births
Kuwaiti footballers
Kuwait international footballers
Association football midfielders
Kuwait SC players
1976 AFC Asian Cup players
1980 AFC Asian Cup players
1982 FIFA World Cup players
Living people
Olympic footballers of Kuwait
Footballers at the 1980 Summer Olympics
AFC Asian Cup-winning players
Kuwait Premier League players